Say! Young Fellow was a 1918 American silent romantic comedy film produced by and starring Douglas Fairbanks and distributed by Famous Players-Lasky /Artcraft. The picture was directed by Joseph Henabery. The film is now considered lost.

Cast
Douglas Fairbanks - The Young Fellow
Marjorie Daw - The Girl
Frank Campeau - The Villain
Edythe Chapman - A Sweet Spinster
James Neill - A Kindly Bachelor
Ernest Butterworth - undetermined role

See also
List of lost films

References

External links

Say! Young Fellow at SilentEra

1918 films
1918 romantic comedy films
American romantic comedy films
American silent feature films
American black-and-white films
Famous Players-Lasky films
Films directed by Joseph Henabery
Films shot in California
Lost American films
1918 lost films
Lost romantic comedy films
1910s American films
Silent romantic comedy films
Silent American comedy films